A disposition is a tendency to act in a specified way.

Disposition may also refer to:

 Disposition (law), a final decision or settlement 
 Disposition (harpsichord), the set of choirs of strings on a harpsichord
 "Disposition" (song), a 2001 progressive metal song by Tool
 Testamentary disposition, any gift of any property by a testator under the terms of a will
 "Disposition" (math), an uncommon way to refer to permutation of n elements over k positions.
 Disposition of human corpses, such as burial or cremation

See also

 Disposal (disambiguation)
 Dispose
 Dispositionalism